Hwang Ho-dong (born 25 December 1936 - 18 March 2010) was a South Korean heavyweight weightlifter who won silver medals at the 1958, 1966 and 1974 Asian Games. He competed at the 1960, 1964 and 1968 Olympics with the best result of eighth place in 1964.

References 

1936 births
2010 deaths
South Korean male weightlifters
Olympic weightlifters of South Korea
Weightlifters at the 1960 Summer Olympics
Weightlifters at the 1964 Summer Olympics
Weightlifters at the 1968 Summer Olympics
Asian Games silver medalists for South Korea
Asian Games medalists in weightlifting
Weightlifters at the 1958 Asian Games
Weightlifters at the 1966 Asian Games
Weightlifters at the 1974 Asian Games
Medalists at the 1958 Asian Games
Medalists at the 1966 Asian Games
Medalists at the 1974 Asian Games
Changwon Hwang clan
Sportspeople from South Jeolla Province
20th-century South Korean people
21st-century South Korean people